Maniitsoq is an island of Greenland. It is located in Tasiusaq Bay in the Upernavik Archipelago.

See also
List of islands of Greenland

References

External links
1:1,000,000 scale Operational Navigation Chart, Sheet B-8

Islands of the Upernavik Archipelago